The Military ranks of Uganda are the military insignia used by the Uganda People's Defence Force. Uganda is a landlocked country and therefore does not have a navy. Being a former British protectorate, Uganda shares a rank structure similar to that of the United Kingdom.

Commissioned officer ranks

The rank insignia of commissioned officers.

Other ranks

The rank insignia of non-commissioned officers and enlisted personnel.

References

External links

 
 

Uganda
Military of Uganda
Uganda and the Commonwealth of Nations